Luo Xiuhua (born 1 June 1977) is a Chinese rower. She competed in the women's eight event at the 2004 Summer Olympics.

References

1977 births
Living people
Chinese female rowers
Olympic rowers of China
Rowers at the 2004 Summer Olympics
People from Nanchong